Kyle Phillips (born May 5, 1997) is an American football defensive end who is currently a free agent. He played college football with the Tennessee Volunteers.

Early years
Phillips grew up in Nashville, Tennessee and attended Hillsboro High School. As a senior, he made 58 tackles (22.5 for loss) with 13 sacks and was named All-Midstate as well as one of The Tennessean's "Dandy Dozen". Phillips was rated a four star recruit and played in the 2015 All-American Bowl, where he committed to play college football at the University of Tennessee over offers from LSU and Ole Miss.

College career
Phillips played four seasons for the Tennessee Volunteers, serving primarily as a reserve defensive lineman until midway through his junior year. He recorded 35 tackles (4.5 for loss) with two sacks and two passes defended in his junior season. As a senior, Phillips made 56 tackles, eight for a loss, and five sacks. On October 20, 2018, against Alabama, he recorded a 27-yard pick-six. He finished his collegiate career with 114 tackles, 16 for a loss, eight sacks, and nine passes defended in 41 games played.

Professional career
Phillips signed with the New York Jets as an undrafted free agent on April 27, 2019 and made the 53-man roster out of training camp. He made his NFL debut on September 16, 2019 against the Cleveland Browns, making two tackles. Phillips finished his rookie season with 39 tackles, nine tackles for loss and 1.5 sacks with a pass defended in 15 games played, four of which he started.

Phillips suffered a season-ending ankle injury on October 25, 2020, in an 18–10 loss to the Buffalo Bills and was placed on injured reserve on October 28. He played in seven games with three starts in the 2020 season, recording 11 tackles, three of which were for loss.

On August 31, 2021, Phillips was placed on the reserve/PUP list to start the season. He was activated on November 17.

Personal life
Phillips mother, Teresa Phillips, served as the athletic director of Tennessee State University from 2002-2019.

References

External links
Tennessee Volunteers bio
New York Jets bio

1997 births
Living people
Players of American football from Nashville, Tennessee
American football defensive ends
Tennessee Volunteers football players
New York Jets players